Paint Your Face is the debut studio album by French recording artist Sliimy. It was released on April 6, 2009 by Warner Music Group.

Track listing
Paint Your Face track listing:

 Wake Up
 Magic Game
 Our Generation
 Every Time
 Paint Your Face
 Baby
 Trust Me
 Mum
 I'm Waiting For
 Tic Tac
 My God
 See You Again
 Womanizer*

References

2009 debut albums
Warner Music Group albums
European Border Breakers Award-winning albums